Mahdi El Khammasi (Arabic:المهدي الخماسي) (born 8 May 1987) is a Qatari born-Tunisian footballer.

External links
 

Tunisian footballers
Qatari footballers
1987 births
Living people
Qatar SC players
Al Kharaitiyat SC players
Qatar Stars League players
Qatari Second Division players
Association football fullbacks
Egyptian emigrants to Qatar
Naturalised citizens of Qatar
Qatari people of Egyptian descent